Events from the year 1900 in Russia.

Incumbents
 Monarch – Nicholas II

Events

 Pyramid of Capitalist System
 Russian polar expedition of 1900–02
  Trans-Siberian Railway Panorama
 Russian Empire at the 1900 Summer Olympics

Births

Deaths

References

1900 in Russia
Years of the 19th century in the Russian Empire